Kapuska is a hearty traditional Turkish cuisine and Balkan cuisine stew whose name is derived from the Slavic languages word for cabbage. Although the name is imported, the dish is a Turkish version of a cabbage stew common in Russia, Ukraine, Poland and other countries of Eastern Europe. Kapuska is widely known and consumed in the Thrace and Black Sea regions of Turkey.

Kapuska is cooked in different ways in Turkey: with garbanzo beans, bulgur, rice, ground meat, lamb, beef, or vegetarian.

It is known to be a dish for the poor. Turkish poet Fethi Naci writes in his memoirs that during World War II the dish they most ate was kapuska.

See also
 Cabbage stew
 Kapusta
 List of cabbage dishes
 List of stews

References

Cooking instructions 
With meat: Turkish Cabbage Stew With Meat

Vegetarian with rice: Vegan Rice Kapuska Recipe

Cabbage dishes
Turkish cuisine
Albanian cuisine
Bulgarian cuisine
Turkish stews